Bartolomeo Aglioni (died 1472) was a Roman Catholic prelate who served as Bishop of Todi (1435–1472).

Biography
On 12 December 1435, Bartolomeo Aglioni was appointed during the papacy of Pope Eugene IV as Bishop of Todi. He served as Bishop of Todi until his death on 4 January 1472. While bishop, he was the principal consecrator of Francesco Oddi de Tuderto, Bishop of Assisi (1445).

References

External links and additional sources
 (for Chronology of Bishops) 
 (for Chronology of Bishops) 

15th-century Italian Roman Catholic bishops
Bishops appointed by Pope Eugene IV
1472 deaths